Leo J. Farley Jr. (1926-1984) was an American politician who served as Mayor of Lowell, Massachusetts and was a member of the Massachusetts House of Representatives.

Early life
Farley was born on June 1, 1926, in Lowell. He grew up in Lowell and graduated from Lowell High School.

Political career
From 1970 to 1977, Farley was a member of the Lowell city council. From 1975 to 1976, he also served as Mayor, a ceremonial position as the city is administrated by a professional city manager. From 1977 to 1979, Farley represented the 44th Middlesex district in the Massachusetts House of Representatives.

Death
Farley died on July 14, 1984, in Lowell.

References

1926 births
1984 deaths
Mayors of Lowell, Massachusetts
Democratic Party members of the Massachusetts House of Representatives
20th-century American politicians